The San Juan National Forest is a U.S. National Forest covering over 1,878,846 acres (2,935.7 sq mi, or 7,603.42 km²) in western Colorado. The forest occupies land in Archuleta, Conejos, Dolores, Hinsdale, La Plata, Mineral, Montezuma, Rio Grande, San Miguel and San Juan Counties. It borders the Uncompahgre National Forest to the north and the Rio Grande National Forest to the east.  The forest covers most of the southern portion of the San Juan Mountains west of the Continental Divide. The forest contains two alpine wilderness areas; the Weminuche and South San Juan, as well as the Piedra Area.
The Durango and Silverton Narrow Gauge Railroad passes through the National Forest.

The name of the forest comes from the San Juan River, which was originally called the Rio San Juan, after Saint John the Baptist (San Juan Bautista in Spanish).

History

Theodore Roosevelt created the forest by proclamation on June 3, 1905. Forest headquarters are located in Durango, Colorado. There are local ranger district offices in Bayfield, Dolores, and Pagosa Springs. President Barack Obama designated part of the forest as Chimney Rock National Monument by proclamation on September 21, 2012.

Wilderness areas
There are three officially designated wilderness areas lying within San Juan National Forest that are part of the National Wilderness Preservation System. All of them extend partially into neighboring National Forests (as indicated).
 Lizard Head Wilderness (partly in Uncompahgre NF)
 South San Juan Wilderness (mostly in Rio Grande NF)
 Weminuche Wilderness (partly in Rio Grande NF)
 Hermosa Creek Wilderness (all on San Juan National Forest)

See also 
 416 Fire
 List of largest United States National Forests
 List of U.S. National Forests

References

External links 

 San Juan National Forest (United States Forest Service)

 
National Forests of Colorado
National Forests of the Rocky Mountains
Colorado Western Slope
Protected areas of Archuleta County, Colorado
Protected areas of Conejos County, Colorado
Protected areas of Dolores County, Colorado
Protected areas of Hinsdale County, Colorado
Protected areas of La Plata County, Colorado
Protected areas of Mineral County, Colorado
Protected areas of Montezuma County, Colorado
Protected areas of Rio Grande County, Colorado
Protected areas of San Miguel County, Colorado
Protected areas of San Juan County, Colorado
Protected areas established in 1905
1905 establishments in Colorado
Parks in Archuleta County, Colorado